The Bahr el Ghazal (also spelled Bahr al Ghazal and Baḩr al Ghazāl) is a river in South Sudan. The South Sudanese region of Bahr el Ghazal takes its name from the river.

The Bahr el Ghazal is the main western tributary of the Nile.

Hydrology

The Bahr al Ghazal's drainage basin is the largest of any of the Nile's sub-basins, measuring 520,000 km (200,800 mi) in size, but it contributes a relatively small amount of water, about 2 m³/s (70 ft³/s) annually, due to tremendous volumes of water being lost in the Sudd wetlands. Seasonally, the river's discharge ranges from nothing to 48 m³/s (1,700 ft³/s).

According to some sources, the river is formed by the confluence of the Jur River and Bahr al-Arab rivers. However other more recent sources say the river rises in the Sudd wetlands with no definitive source, that the Jur River joins at Lake Ambadi, and the Bahr al-Arab joins below that.

History
The river was first mapped in 1772 by French geographer Jean-Baptiste Bourguignon d'Anville, although it was vaguely known to early Greek geographers.

See also
List of rivers of South Sudan

References

External links
 
 Bahr-el-Ghazal, The Columbia Encyclopedia, Sixth Edition
 Baḩr al Ghazāl , GEOnet Names Server

Rivers of South Sudan
Bahr el Ghazal
Nile basin
Tributaries of the Nile
White Nile